"You Are Old, Father William" is a poem by Lewis Carroll that appears in his 1865 book Alice's Adventures in Wonderland. It is recited by Alice in Chapter 5, "Advice from a Caterpillar" (Chapter 3 in the original manuscript). Alice informs the Caterpillar that she has previously tried to repeat "How Doth the Little Busy Bee" and has had it all come wrong as "How Doth the Little Crocodile". The Caterpillar asks her to repeat "You Are Old, Father William", and she recites it.

Text

Provenance

Like most poems in Alice, the poem is a parody of a poem then well-known to children, Robert Southey's didactic poem "The Old Man's Comforts and How He Gained Them", originally published in 1799. Like the other poems parodied by Lewis Carroll in Alice, this original poem is now mostly forgotten, and only the parody is remembered. Carroll's parody "undermines the pious didacticism of Southey's original and gives Father William an eccentric vitality that rebounds upon his idiot questioner". Martin Gardner calls it "one of the undisputed masterpieces of nonsense verse". Since then, it has been parodied further, including more than 20 versions by 1886 a version by Charles Larcom Graves, a writer for Punch in 1889, and "You are young, Kaiser William".

Appearances

In the Walt Disney animated film Alice in Wonderland (1951) the first stanza of the poem is recited by Tweedledum and Tweedledee as a song.

"Father William" was played by Sammy Davis, Jr. in the 1985 film. Davis, Jr. also sang the poem.

The 1999 film briefly shows Father William as Alice recites the first verse of the poem to the Caterpillar.

They Might Be Giants recorded a song using the lyrics of the poem for the compilation album Almost Alice for the 2010 film Alice in Wonderland.

The poem's first Stanza makes an appearance in the mystery comedy drama Monk, in Season 4's episode Mr. Monk Goes to a Wedding, where a supporting character recites the poem in an attempt to stall the killer's plan.

Notes

External links

 

Alice's Adventures in Wonderland
Poetry by Lewis Carroll
1865 poems
Parodies of literature